Lieutenant-General  Charles Wright Younghusband  (20 June 1821 – 28 October  1899) CB FRS was a British Army officer and meteorologist.

Early life and education 
He was the son of Maj.-Gen. Charles Younghusband (1778–1843) and Frances Romer (1789–1843). His four brothers were also Army officers.

Career 
Like his father, he was an officer in the Royal Artillery. Aged 16, he was described as "probably the youngest and smallest officer in the service".

Aged 20, he was appointed acting superintendent of the Magnetic Observatory in Toronto, Canada, and acted as its director from 1841to 1844.

He later served in the Crimea and became superintendent of the Royal Gun Factories.

Selected publications 
 "Magnetical and Meteorological Observations at Lake Athabasca and Fort Simpson", with John Henry Lefroy (1855)
 "Observations on Days of Unusual Magnetic Disturbance: Made at the British Colonial Magnetic Observatories, Under The Departments of the Ordnance And Admiralty", with Sir Edward Sabine

Awards and honours 
He was made a fellow of the Royal Society on 3 June 1852.

Personal life 
On 2 April 1825 at Brockville, Ontario, Canada, he married Mary Elizabeth Jones, daughter of Jonas Jones, judge and politician.
His son, Captain Frank Campbell Younghusband (7 January 1851 – 16 May 1894) was also an Army officer.

His nephew was the explorer Lieutenant-Colonel Sir Francis Younghusband.

References 

1821 births
1899 deaths
British meteorologists
Royal Artillery officers
British Army generals
Fellows of the Royal Society
Companions of the Order of the Bath
Charles